One False Step for Mankind is a board game designed by James Ernest and published by Cheapass Games in 2003. Players play the role of town mayors, seeking to become governor of California in 1849 (during the California Gold Rush). According to the game rules "It's one false step for Mankind, one giant leap for you." This is a clear play on astronaut Neil Armstrong's first spoken words on the surface of the moon in 1969.

Through gold mining, claim-jumping, trading, farming, building cities, and constructing rockets to fly to the moon, players vie for money and influence in order to become governor. The first player to reach 30 points of influence is deemed to have become governor and wins the game.

References

External links
One False Step for Mankind product page at Cheapass Games

Independent Game Review
Independent Game Review

Board games introduced in 2003
Cheapass Games games
Board games with a modular board
California Gold Rush in fiction